Ab Mis (also Romanized as Āb Mīs; also known as Āb Madīk and Āb Mīsk) is a village in Amjaz Rural District, in the Central District of Anbarabad County, Kerman Province, Iran. At the 2006 census, its population was 47, in 13 families.

References 

Populated places in Anbarabad County